Solenzara Airfield is an abandoned World War II military airfield in France, which is located approximately 31 km north-northeast of Porto-Vecchio on Corsica.  It was a temporary airfield used by the United States Army Air Force Twelfth Air Force 415th Night Fighter Squadron between 9 July-1  September, flying Bristol Beaufighters.

When the Americans pulled out the airfield was dismantled by engineers.  Today the location of the airfield is abandoned and is a grass pasture.

References

 Maurer, Maurer. Air Force Combat Units of World War II. Maxwell AFB, Alabama: Office of Air Force History, 1983. .

External links

Airfields of the United States Army Air Forces in France
Airports established in 1944